Rock climbing is a popular activity in the Peak District; particularly on edges such as Stanage or Froggatt. Generally the climbing style is free climbing (as opposed to aid climbing)  and the rock is either gritstone or limestone. Climbing has been practised in the Peak District since the late 19th century; James W. Puttrell is generally credited with starting the sport.  The first climbing guidebook to the area was Some Gritstone Climbs, by John Laycock, published in 1913.
There are over 10,000 routes in the Peak District.
One of the most famous Peak District climbers, and a pioneer of many new routes, is Ron Fawcett. The climb known as "Master's Edge", on Millstone Edge, near Hathersage, is a testament to his skill and strength. The climb is graded E7 6c and rises 19m up the near vertical edge.

Gritstone 

The gritstone crags include:

Western Grit (Staffordshire, Kinder, Bleaklow, and the Chew Valley)
 The Roaches
 Hen Cloud
 Ramshaw
 Windgather
Castle Naze
 Kinder Scout
 Shining Clough
 Dovestones Edge
 Ravenstones
 Rob's Rocks
 Wimberry

Eastern Grit (Derwent Valley, Sheffield, Derbyshire)
 Rivelin Rocks
 Stanage Edge
 Derwent Edge
 Burbage Rocks
 Millstone Edge
 Froggatt Edge
 Curbar Edge
 Birchen Edge
 Gardom's Edge
 Black Rocks
 Bamford Edge
 Higger Tor
 Dovestone Tor (on Derwent Edge)
 Cratcliffe Tor
 Baslow Edge

Limestone 

In-situ bolts and pitons are more acceptable on limestone and some crags are almost exclusively bolted.

 Beeston Tor
 Chee Dale
 Deep Dale
 High Tor
Middleton Dale
 Pic Tor
 Raven Tor
 Thor's Cave
 Wild Cat

References

External links
 The British Mountaineering Council web site
 The Association of Mountaineering Instructors web site

Sport in Derbyshire
Tourist attractions in Derbyshire
Climbing areas of England
Climbing in England
Peak District